Nepal is a country in South Asia.

Nepal may also refer to:

Kingdom of Nepal, a kingdom in Asia from 1768 to 2008
Greater Nepal, an idea extending Nepal into Indian territory occupied between 1791 and 1816
Nepal (band), an Argentine thrash metal band
Népal (rapper) (1994-2019), French rapper
Nepal (surname), Nepali surname
Madhav Kumar Nepal, Prime Minister of Nepal from May 2009 to February 2011

See also
Nepa (disambiguation)